Hadis Zubanović  (born 14 January 1978) is a Bosnian retired professional footballer who played as a forward.

Club career
Born in Sarajevo, SR Bosnia and Herzegovina, SFR Yugoslavia, Zubanović began his career with hometown club Željezničar. He started playing for the first team in the 1995–96 season as a youngster. He was regarded as one of the most promising forwards in the First League of Bosnia and Herzegovina.

In 1999, Zubanović left for Turkey where he signed a contract with Karabükspor. After only half of a season, he returned to Željezničar where he stayed for two more years. Later, he played for İstanbulspor, Velež Mostar and Dibba Al-Hisn Sports Club, before returning to Željezničar once again in 2004.

Zubanović did not stay there for long, since he went to Poland at the end of that year. From 2005 to 2007 he played for Zagłębie Sosnowiec where he finished his career.

The most memorable moment of his career came when he scored in the 93rd minute for Željezničar on 5 June 1998 in a Bosnian championship play-off game during season 1997–98 against crosstown rivals Sarajevo. That was the only goal of the game which brought his club its first championship title in independent Bosnia and Herzegovina.

International career
Zubanović also played for the Bosnia and Herzegovina U21 national team between 1996 and 1999, making 15 appearances and scoring 4 goals in the process.

Personal life
Zubanović's son Faris is also a professional footballer.

Honours

Player
Željezničar
Bosnian Premier League: 1997–98, 2000–01
Bosnian Cup: 1999–00, 2000–2001
Bosnian Supercup: 1998, 2000, 2001

References

External links

1978 births
Living people
Footballers from Sarajevo
Association football forwards
Bosnia and Herzegovina footballers
Bosnia and Herzegovina under-21 international footballers
FK Željezničar Sarajevo players
Kardemir Karabükspor footballers
İstanbulspor footballers
FC Anzhi Makhachkala players
FK Velež Mostar players
Dibba Al-Hisn Sports Club players
Zagłębie Sosnowiec players
Süper Lig players
Premier League of Bosnia and Herzegovina players
Russian Premier League players
UAE First Division League players
I liga players
Ekstraklasa players
Bosnia and Herzegovina expatriate footballers
Expatriate footballers in Turkey
Bosnia and Herzegovina expatriate sportspeople in Turkey
Expatriate footballers in Russia
Bosnia and Herzegovina expatriate sportspeople in Russia
Expatriate footballers in the United Arab Emirates
Bosnia and Herzegovina expatriate sportspeople in the United Arab Emirates
Expatriate footballers in Poland
Bosnia and Herzegovina expatriate sportspeople in Poland